"The American Scholar" was a speech given by Ralph Waldo Emerson on August 31, 1837, to the Phi Beta Kappa Society of Harvard College at the First Parish in Cambridge in Cambridge, Massachusetts. He was invited to speak in recognition of his groundbreaking work Nature, published a year earlier, in which he established a new way for America's fledgling society to regard the world. Sixty years after declaring independence, American culture was still heavily influenced by Europe, and Emerson, for possibly the first time in the country's history, provided a visionary philosophical framework for escaping "from under its iron lids" and building a new, distinctly American cultural identity.

Summary
Emerson introduces Transcendentalist and Romantic views to explain an American scholar's relationship to nature. A few key points he makes include:
 We are all fragments, "as the hand is divided into fingers", of a greater creature, which is mankind itself.
 An individual may live in either of two states.  In one, the busy, "divided" or "degenerate" state, he does not "possess himself" but identifies with his occupation or a monotonous action; in the other, "right" state, he is elevated to "Man", at one with all mankind.
 To achieve this higher state of mind, the modern American scholar must reject old ideas and think for him or herself, to become "Man Thinking" rather than "a mere thinker, or still worse, the parrot of other men's thinking", "the victim of society", "the sluggard intellect of this continent".
 "The American Scholar" has an obligation, as "Man Thinking", within this "One Man" concept, to see the world clearly, not severely influenced by traditional and historical views, and to broaden his understanding of the world from fresh eyes, to "defer never to the popular cry."
 The scholar's education consists of three influences:
  I. Nature, as the most important influence on the mind
 II. The Past, manifest in books
III. Action and its relation to experience
 The last, unnumbered part of the text is devoted to Emerson's view on the "Duties" of the American Scholar who has become the "Man Thinking".
 "The scholar must needs stand wistful and admiring before this great spectacle. He must settle its value in his mind."

Importance
Emerson was, in part, reflecting on his personal vocational crisis after leaving his role as a minister. Oliver Wendell Holmes, Sr. declared this speech to be "the declaration of independence of American intellectual life." Building on the growing attention he received from the essay Nature, The American Scholar solidified Emerson's popularity and weight in America, a level of reverence he would hold throughout the rest of his life. Phi Beta Kappa's literary quarterly magazine, The American Scholar, was named after the speech.

This success stands in contrast with the harsh reaction to another of his speeches, "Divinity School Address", given eleven months later.

See also
American culture
Empiricism
Great American Novel
Humanism
Romanticism
Transcendentalism

References

Further reading
Kenneth Sacks: Understanding Emerson: "The American Scholar" and His Struggle For Self-Reliance. Princeton, New Jersey: Princeton University Press, 2003. 199 pages.
 John Hansen: “The New American Scholar.” The Pluralist 9.1 (2014): 97-103.

External links
 
 The entire speech, verbatim. (copy #1)
 The entire speech, verbatim. (copy #2)

Transcendentalism
Works by Ralph Waldo Emerson
1837 essays
1837 speeches